A hexayurt is a simplified disaster relief shelter design. It is based on a hexagonal geodesic geometry adapted to construction from standard 4x8 foot sheets of factory made construction material, built as a yurt. It was invented by Vinay Gupta. Hexayurts are common at Burning Man.

References

See also
Yurt

Tents